FK Meteor Prague VIII is a football club located in Prague-Libeň, Czech Republic. It currently plays in the Czech Fourth Division. Founded in 1896,  it is one of the oldest football clubs in the country. The club played in the inaugural Czechoslovak First League in 1925.

Reserves
As of 2011–12, Meteor's reserve team, FK Meteor Prague VIII B, play in the I.B class.

Historical names

1896 Sportovní kroužek Kotva Libeň
1899 SK Meteor Libeň
1901 SK Meteor Praha VIII
1948 Sokol České Loděnice
1953 DSO Spartak Loděnice
1957 TJ Libeň Loděnice
1966 TJ Meteor Praha
1976 TJ Meteor Praha ŽSP
19?? TJ Meteor Praha
19?? SK Meteor Praha
1994 FK Meteor Praha VIII

Honours
Czech Fourth Division, Divize B
 Champions 2012–13
Prague Championship (fifth tier)
 Champions 2007–08

References

External links
 Official website 
 FK Meteor Prague VIII at the website of the Prague Football Association 

Football clubs in the Czech Republic
Meteor
Prague, Meteor
Association football clubs established in 1896
Football clubs in Austria-Hungary